Ufelwy is a 6th-century saint of Wales and grandson of Gildas. He was a priest, bishop, saint and confessor. He was granted land from church officials upon which he built a church.

References

 

Welsh Roman Catholic saints
6th-century Christian saints